First-seeded Helen Wills defeated Molla Mallory 6–1, 6–3 in the final to win the women's singles tennis title at the 1924 U.S. National Championships. The event was held at the West Side Tennis Club, Forest Hills, New York City. It was Wills's second consecutive U.S. National singles title.

Draw

Final eight

References

1924
1924 in women's tennis
1924 in American women's sports
Women's Singles
1920s in New York City
1924 in sports in New York (state)
Women's sports in New York (state)